Kevin Fouser is a retired American soccer forward who spent two seasons in the American Soccer League and at least one in the SISL.

In 1980, Fouser played for the United States U-20 men's national soccer team which qualified for the 
1981 FIFA World Youth Championship.  In 1982, he played for the Georgia Generals in the American Soccer League.  In 1983, he played for the Carolina Lightnin'. In 1985, he played for the amateur Norell Services of Atlanta when that team went to the 1985 U.S. Open Cup Round of Sixteen.  In 1990, he played for the Georgia Steamers of the Sunbelt Independent Soccer League.

References

American soccer players
American Soccer League (1933–1983) players
Georgia Generals players
Georgia Steamers players
Carolina Lightnin' players
USISL players
Living people
Association football forwards
Year of birth missing (living people)
Soccer players from Atlanta